Pamal Broadcasting, Ltd. is a family-owned radio group with twenty-three stations in medium-to-small markets in the Northeast. Based in the Albany suburb of Latham, New York, Pamal Broadcasting was founded in 1987 as Albany Broadcasting Company, when business man James J. Morrell entered broadcast ownership with the purchase of WFLY and WPTR from Five States Tower Company, a Poughkeepsie, New York-based broadcasting company that also owned radio stations WPDH and WEOK in the mid-Hudson valley.  The Pamal name, a portmanteau of the names of Morrell's children, was adopted in 1996 though each cluster uses a unique name (such as Albany Broadcasting for the Albany cluster; the Pamal name is rarely used on-air, except in the Hudson Valley).

In 2005, Pamal Broadcasting was the 27th-largest owner of radio stations in the United States.  By mid-2011, the company has divested itself of 40% of its radio station licenses from its 2005 high-water mark. Pamal completed its exit from Florida in 2013.

Stations

Former Pamal Stations
WDCD Albany, New York (owned under its original WPTR calls until 1995 when sold to Crawford Broadcasting)
WRNX Amherst, Massachusetts (owned 2003-06, sold to Clear Channel Communications, in 2007)
WVTQ Formerly WJAN Sunderland, Vermont, sold to Vermont Public Radio in 2007
WRGO Cedar Key, Florida, sold to WRGO RADIO, LLC in 2007
WYNY Cross City, Florida, sold to WRGO RADIO, LLC in 2007
WIZR Johnstown, New York, sold to WIZR AM Radio, LLC in 2010
WPYR Baton Rouge, Louisiana, sold to Michael Glitner in 2008
WDVH Gainesville, Florida Sold to MARC Radio Gainesville, LLC July 2011
WDVH-FM Trenton, Florida Sold to MARC Radio Gainesville, LLC July 2011
WHHZ Newberry, Florida Sold to MARC Radio Gainesville, LLC July 2011
WKZY Cross City, Florida Sold to MARC Radio Gainesville, LLC July 2011 
WRZN Hernando, Florida Sold to MARC Radio Gainesville, LLC July 2011 
WTMG Williston, Florida Sold to MARC Radio Gainesville, LLC July 2011
WTMN Gainesville, Florida Sold to MARC Radio Gainesville, LLC July 2011 
WPNI Amherst, Massachusetts (owned 2003–14; shut down November 30, 2013 and license returned to the Federal Communications Commission on May 27, 2014)
WMEZ Pensacola, Florida Sold to Cumulus Broadcasting in January 2013
WXBM Pensacola, Florida Sold to Cumulus Broadcasting in January 2013

Two stations were to be acquired by Pamal, though never purchased. 
WNYQ Queensbury, New York (controlled by Pamal 2004-06 prior to move into the Albany market and purchase by Regent Communications who now operates it as WQBK-FM)
WBEC-FM Pittsfield, Massachusetts (Pamal had an agreement in principle to move the station to the Springfield market, but later sold it to Entercom Communications which now operates it as WWEI).

External links
 Company homepage

 
Radio broadcasting companies of the United States
Companies based in New York (state)